Lindon W. Barrett Ph.D. (October 10, 1961 – July 7, 2008) was a literary and cultural theorist, professor and director of African studies at the University of California, Irvine.

Biography 
Barrett was born in Guyana to Dorothy and Leslie Barrett, later moving to England at the age of one. Five years later, the family moved to Winnipeg, Manitoba, Canada. Studying at both the University of Manitoba and York University in Toronto, Barrett received his undergraduate B.A. in 1983. Working toward his graduate degree at the University of Denver, he received his master's degree in 1986. Moving forward with his education, Lindon began work at the University of Pennsylvania in order to achieve his Ph.D., which he was awarded in 1990. That year, he started his first academic job, at the University of California-Irvine. By 2001, he rose from his assistant position to full professor at Irvine. He remained at Irvine for 17 years until 2007, when he joined the faculty at the University of California-Riverside.

Academic career 
He became one of the founding members of the African American Studies program at UCI, where he served as director from 2003 until 2007. He taught an array of subjects at UCI, including literary culture and theory, gender and sexuality, African American literature and pop culture. Barrett would go on to be a respected writer and author of numerous books that deal with race and other social issues the most notable being Racial Blackness and the Discontinuity of Western Modernity and Blackness and Value: Seeing Double.

Racial Blackness and the Discontinuity of Western Modernity 
Published as an incomplete manuscript the book approaches the "genealogy of how the development of racial blackness within the mercantile capitalist system of Euro-American colonial imperialism was constitutive of Western modernity." Barrett looks at the connections between historical systems of racial slavery to post-Enlightenment modernity, showing how Western modernity depended on a particular conception of racism.

Blackness and Value: Seeing Double 
Barrett tackles multiple social justice issues speaking not only to theorists of race but also of gender and queer studies. He "investigates the principles by which 'value' operates, and asks if it is useful to imagine the concepts of racial blackness and whiteness in the U.S. operate in terms of these principles."

Death 
Lindon Barrett was found dead at his Long Beach home in 2008; he was 46 years old. He was alleged to have been murdered by Marlon Martinez, an apparent acquaintance, who died in jail while awaiting trial. Police were called to Barrett's home by neighbors who reported a "foul odor" in the area. Investigations found that his car was also missing and they were able to locate it on Paramount Boulevard at South Street and arrested Marlon Martinez as he attempted to enter the vehicle.

References

1961 births
2008 deaths
University of California, Irvine faculty
University of California, Riverside faculty
University of Manitoba alumni
York University alumni
University of Denver alumni